Lonchophora is a genus of flowering plants belonging to the family Brassicaceae.

Its native range is Northern Africa.

Species
Species:
 Lonchophora capiomontana Durieu

References

Brassicaceae
Brassicaceae genera